William Ridley may refer to:
William Ridley (engraver) (1764–1838), British engraver
William Ridley (bishop) (1836–1911), Anglican bishop in Canada
William Ridley (Presbyterian missionary) (1819–1878), Presbyterian missionary and linguist in Australia
William Henry Ridley (1816–1882), Church of England priest and author